Battle of Venni is a military engagement fought by the early historic Chola (Uraiyur) ruler Karikala with a confederacy of Pandya (Madurai) and Chera rulers. Venni is identified with present day Kovilvenni near Thanjavur, southern India.

Upon the accession of Karikala, at a young age, there was a civil conflict in the Chola territory. By the time Karikala had succeeded in vanquishing rival claimants and establishing his hold over the territory, the neighboring Chera and Pandya rulers saw their opportunity. The two rulers formed a confederacy which also included eleven Velir chieftains apart from the two major rulers and invaded the Chola territory. It is unclear why even the Velir who were generally the allies of the Cholas stood against Karikala, the scion of the solar race and of the Kashyapa gotra, though Karikala by his brilliant stratagem inflicted a crushing defeat on the alliance in the ensuing encounter at Venni. Following his defeat, the Chera ruler Uthiyan Cheralathan starved himself to death (suicide by slow starvation). 

The battle is generally considered historical and dated approximately to 130 CE.

References 

 

Venni
Venni
Chera dynasty
130
2nd century in India
Venni